Marina Łuczenko-Szczęsna (née Łuczenko; born 3 July 1989), known mononymously as Marina (stylized as MaRina), is a Polish singer, songwriter and actress.

She is married to Polish footballer Wojciech Szczęsny. They have a son.

Biography

1989–2008: Early life and career beginnings
Marina Łuczenko was born in Vinnytsia, Ukraine (then the USSR). At the age of two, she moved with her family to Poland.

As a child, Marina took part in numerous singing contests and television music competitions, winning on many occasions. She began her professional career in 2000, appearing in Waldemar Krzysteks television play Ballada o zabójcach. She competed in Poland's national final for the inaugural Junior Eurovision Song Contest 2003 with the song "Sen". In 2004, Marina played the lead role of Juliet in Studio Buffo Theatres adaptation of Romeo and Juliet directed by Janusz Józefowicz. In 2007, she took part in the contest New Wave, and came third. She was awarded $20,000, and was offered a record deal with Universal Music Germany, which she rejected as she did not agree with its terms. She also received a special prize of $50,000 from one of the competition's organisers Alla Pugacheva.

In 2008, Marina participated in the seventh season of the Polish version of Dancing with the Stars franchise called Taniec z Gwiazdami. She was partnered with the professional dancer Michał Uryniuk, with whom she finished tenth.

2009–2012: Breakthrough: 39 i pół, "Glam Pop" and Hardbeat

In 2009, Marina was cast as Amanda, the daughter of the main character (played by Tomasz Karolak), in the Polish television series 39 i pół. She recorded four songs for its soundtrack 39 i pół Vol. 3.

Her debut single, "Glam Pop", was released in 2010 and became a radio hit in Poland. That year, she received Eska Music Award for Best Debut. She also released her second single "Pepper Mint" and guest starred in the Polish television series Usta usta.

After parting ways with her manager Maja Sablewska in 2011, she began recording new material for her debut studio album. The album titled Hardbeat, which she released independently in November 2011, received positive reviews from music critics. It was preceded by the lead single "Electric Bass", released the previous month. The album's second and final single "Saturday Night" followed in 2012. Marina was nominated for VIVA Comet Awards in 2011 and 2012, receiving a total of six nominations, including one for Female Artist of the Year and one for Album of the Year (Hardbeat).

In 2012, she was confirmed as Levi's Autumn-Winter 2012/2013 ambassador in Poland.

2013–present: Hiatus, On My Way, 39 i pół tygodnia and Warstwy
In October 2013, while working on new music in a recording studio in London, Marina experienced singing difficulties which proved to be caused by a polyp on her left vocal cord. As a result, she was forced to put her career on hold, and in May 2014 underwent laser microsurgery performed by Steven M. Zeitels to remove the polyp.

Marina's comeback single and the lead single from her second studio album, "On My Way", was released in April 2016. The song was co-written by Arrow Benjamin and produced by Pete Boxta. That year, she also featured on James Arthurs song "Let Me Love the Lonely" from his second studio album Back from the Edge (2016). Released as a single in Poland, it was certified gold by the Polish Society of the Phonographic Industry (ZPAV).

Marina released her second studio album On My Way on 17 November 2017. The album features ten tracks in English, including a song written by her husband Wojciech Szczęsny ("I Do") and a song co-written with James Arthur ("Lay My Body Down"). "Takin' Ya Rock Out" and "Hiding in the Water" served as the album's second and third singles, respectively. Its fourth and final single, "Complete", was released in August 2018.

Marina reprised her 39 i pół role in the show's revival called 39 i pół tygodnia in September 2019. She released her third studio album, Warstwy, in December 2020. The record debuted and peaked at number 50 in the Polish charts, and was promoted with four singles: "News" with Kabe, "Nigdy więcej" with Young Igi, "Skandal (Odbijam)" with Smolasty and "Nie prowokuj". The first two singles were certified Gold and Platinum by ZPAV, respectively. In 2021, Marina collaborated with Meggie on the single "Lip Gloss". In 2022, she recorded the song "This Is the Moment" in support of Poland at the 2022 FIFA World Cup.

Personal life
Marina started dating Polish national football player Wojciech Szczęsny in 2013. They got engaged in early July 2015 during her birthday party, and married on 21 May 2016. On 30 June 2018, she gave birth to their son, Liam.

Discography

Studio albums

Singles

As lead artist

As featured artist

Other recorded songs

Filmography
 2009: 39 i pół (TV series) as Amanda
 2009: I pół (TV movie) as Amanda
 2010: Usta usta (TV series) as Emilia Skowron
 2019: 39 i pół tygodnia (TV series) as Amanda

Notes

References

External links

 Official website
 

1989 births
Living people
Musicians from Vinnytsia
Polish pop singers
Ukrainian people of Polish descent
English-language singers from Poland
21st-century Polish singers
21st-century Polish women singers
Ukrainian emigrants to Poland